Sergio Maciel (7 December 1965 – 5 August 2008) was an Argentine football striker.

References

1965 births
2008 deaths
Argentine footballers
Deportivo Armenio footballers
FC 08 Homburg players
SpVg Blau-Weiß 90 Berlin players
Estudiantes de La Plata footballers
San Lorenzo de Almagro footballers
CD Toledo players
Gimnasia y Tiro footballers
2. Bundesliga players
Argentine expatriate footballers
Expatriate footballers in Germany
Argentine expatriate sportspeople in Germany
Expatriate footballers in Spain
Argentine expatriate sportspeople in Spain
Association football forwards
Argentina international footballers